The Ven. Francis Harry House OBE MA was Archdeacon of Macclesfield from 1967 to 1978.

Born into an ecclesiastical family on 9 August 1908, he was educated at St George's School, Harpenden and Wadham College, Oxford and ordained after a period of study at Ripon College Cuddesdon in 1937. He was  successively: Assistant Missioner at the Pembroke College, Cambridge Mission at Walworth; Travelling Secretary of the World's Student Christian Federation at Geneva from 1938 to 1940.; Curate of Leeds Parish Church from 1940 to 1942; Overseas Assistant of the BBC Religious Broadcasting Department in London from 1942 to 1944; representative of World Student Relief in Greece from 1944 to 1946; Secretary of the Youth Department World Council of Churches in Geneva and the  World Conference of Christian Youth, Oslo in 1946 and 1947 respectively;Head of Religious Broadcasting at the BBC in London from 1947 to 1955; Associate General Secretary of the World Council of Churches in Geneva from 1955 to 1962; and Vicar of St Giles, Pontefract before his years as an Archdeacon.

He died on 1 September 2004.

Notes

1908 births
People educated at St George's School, Harpenden
Alumni of Wadham College, Oxford
Alumni of Ripon College Cuddesdon
Officers of the Order of the British Empire
Archdeacons of Macclesfield
2004 deaths